Marta Domachowska and Andrea Hlaváčková were the defending champions, but Domachowska chose not to participate, whilst Hlaváčková chose to participate in Poitiers instead.

The top seeds Ysaline Bonaventure and Nicola Slater won the title, defeating Sonja Molnar and Caitlin Whoriskey in the final, 6–4, 6–4.

Seeds

Draw

References 
 Draw

Challenger Banque Nationale de Saguenay
Challenger de Saguenay